The BU11 LRT station is a Light Rapid Transit (LRT) station that serve the suburb of BU11 Bandar Utama, Petaling Jaya Malaysia serves as one of the stations on the Shah Alam line. The station is located next to SPRINT Highway Damansara Toll Plaza.The station is an elevated rapid transit station in  forming part of the Klang Valley Integrated Transit System.

The station is marked as Station No. 3 along with the RM9 billion line project with the line's maintenance depot located in Johan Setia, Klang. The BU11 LRT station is expected to be operational in February 2024 and will have facilities such as multi-story park and ride, kiosks, restrooms, elevators, taxi stand, and feeder bus among others.

Surrounding Area
 BU11 residential, Bandar Utama
 The British International School of Kuala Lumpur
 First City University College
 SJK(T) Effingham
 Kuarters Institusi Pendidikan Bandar Utama
 Tropicana Landscape & Nursery
 Merchant Square Comercial Area
 Centerpoint Bandar Utama
 Bayu Puteri Apartment
 Pangsapuri Permai
 Pangsapuri Damai
 SMK Tropicana

References

External links
 LRT3 website

Rapid transit stations in Selangor
Shah Alam Line